The Kraichgau is a hilly region in Baden-Württemberg, southwestern Germany.  It is bordered by the Odenwald and the Neckar to the North, the Black Forest to the South, and the Upper Rhine Plain to the West.  To the east, its boundary is considered to be the Stromberg and the Heuchelberg.

The largest towns of the Kraichgau are Sinsheim, Eppingen, and Bretten.  On the western end of the Kraichgau is the town of Bruchsal, the gateway to the Rhineland plains.

Origins of the name
The word "Kraich" apparently arose from the Celtic word "Creuch," meaning "mud" or "loam."  The territory of a  Gau (country subdivision) signifies an open area, free from woods, such as farmland or meadows.

The area of Kraichgau was first mentioned in the Early Middle Ages, in the Lorsch codex, as "Creichgowe" in the year 769.  In 773, it was called "Chrehgauui," in 778 "Craichgoia."
By 1594, the name was closer to its modern form, being referred to as "Kreuchgau."

See also
Aalkistensee

Regions of Baden-Württemberg
Natural regions of the Neckar and Tauber Gäu Plateaus